Ronald L. McAnally (born July 11, 1932, in Covington, Kentucky) is an American Hall of Fame trainer in Thoroughbred horse racing. Called "one of the most honored and respected of North American trainers" by Thoroughbred Times Co., Inc, as a child, he and his four siblings were placed in an orphanage following the death of their mother. As an adult, he regularly donates funds to the Covington Protestant Children's Home where he was raised.

After high school, McAnally fulfilled his mandatory military service with the United States Air Force and attended the University of Cincinnati for two years, studying electrical engineering. He began his career in horse racing working at Rockingham Park racetrack in Salem, New Hampshire for his uncle, trainer Reggie Cornell. As a licensed trainer working at California racetracks, in 1958 he got his first win at Hollywood Park Racetrack and in 1960 at Santa Anita Park he got the first of his more than 2,000 stakes race wins.

He is noted, perhaps because of his childhood experiences, for patiently looking after horses with unique quirks such as the one-eyed Cassaleria, and the tail-less Sea Cadet. As well, he conditioned Silver Ending, a "worthless" horse bought for $1,500 who under McAnally's care won a number of stakes races including the Arkansas Derby and the then GI Pegasus Handicap.

In the early 1980s Ron McAnally gained considerable national recognition as the trainer of John Henry, the two-time United States Horse of the Year and the first of three Hall of Fame horses he would train. John Henry came under McAnally's care at age four having earned $239,613. For  McAnally he won 27 of his 45 races and earned $6,358,334.

Other Hall of Fame horses McAnally trained were Bayakoa, who won back-to-back Breeders' Cup Distaffs in 1989 and 1990 and was voted the Eclipse Award for Outstanding Older Female Horse both years. Two years later, he conditioned his third Hall of Famer, another filly named Paseana who also won the Breeders' Cup Distaff in 1992 and who too was voted the Eclipse Award for Outstanding Older Female Horse Eclipse for two years running. McAnally's best result in the American Classic Races was a fourth in the 1980 and 1982 Kentucky Derby, a fourth in the 1989 Preakness Stakes, and a fifth-place finish in the 1989 Belmont Stakes.

Personal honors include the Eclipse Award for Outstanding Trainer three times and induction in the National Museum of Racing and Hall of Fame.

Married with three daughters, the McAnally family make their home in Tarzana, California.

References
 Thoroughbred Times article on Ron McAnally
 Ron McAnally at the NTRA
 Ron McAnally at the United States' National Museum of Racing and Hall of Fame

American horse trainers
United States Thoroughbred Racing Hall of Fame inductees
Sportspeople from Covington, Kentucky
1932 births
Living people
People from Tarzana, Los Angeles
Eclipse Award winners
University of Cincinnati alumni